John Berry (April 26, 1833 – May 18, 1879) was an American lawyer and politician who served one term as a U.S. Representative from Ohio from 1873 to 1875.

Life and career
Born near Carey, in that portion of Crawford County which is now Wyandot County, Ohio, Berry attended public schools and Ohio Wesleyan University at Delaware. He graduated from the law department of Cincinnati College, in 1857.
He was admitted to the bar in April 1857 and commenced practice in Upper Sandusky, Ohio.

Berry was elected prosecuting attorney of Wyandot County in 1862. He was reelected in 1864. He served as mayor of Upper Sandusky in 1864. A son, Junius, died as an infant in July of that year.

Congress and later career 
Berry was elected as a Democrat to the Forty-third Congress (March 4, 1873 – March 4, 1875). He declined to be a candidate for renomination in 1874. He resumed the practice of law in Upper Sandusky, Ohio, where he died May 18, 1879. He was interred in Oak Hill Cemetery, near Upper Sandusky, Ohio.

Sources

External links

1833 births
1879 deaths
Mayors of places in Ohio
Ohio Wesleyan University alumni
People from Carey, Ohio
University of Cincinnati College of Law alumni
Democratic Party members of the United States House of Representatives from Ohio
County district attorneys in Ohio
19th-century American politicians